Richard Alejandro Arratia is a mathematician noted for his work in combinatorics and probability theory.

Contributions
Arratia developed the ideas of interlace polynomials with Béla Bollobás and Gregory Sorkin, found an equivalent formulation of the Stanley–Wilf conjecture as the convergence of a limit, and was the first to investigate the lengths of superpatterns of permutations.

He has also written highly cited papers on the Chen–Stein method on distances between probability distributions, on random walks with exclusion, and on sequence alignment.

He is a coauthor of the book Logarithmic Combinatorial Structures: A Probabilistic Approach.

Education and employment
Arratia earned his Ph.D. in 1979 from the University of Wisconsin–Madison under the supervision of David Griffeath. He is currently a professor of mathematics at  the University of Southern California.

Selected publications
Research papers

Books

References

External links

USC faculty page

Year of birth missing (living people)
Living people
20th-century American mathematicians
21st-century American mathematicians
Combinatorialists
Probability theorists
Stuyvesant High School alumni
University of Wisconsin–Madison alumni
University of Southern California faculty